Sporotrichosis, also known as rose handler's disease, is a fungal infection that affects skin, lungs, bone and joint, and can become systemic. It presents with firm painless nodules that later ulcerate. It can be localized or widespread. The disease progresses over a week to several months after the initial exposure to the fungus. Serious complications can also develop in people who have a weakened immune system.

Sporotrichosis is caused by fungi of the Sporothrix schenckii species complex. Because S. schenckii is naturally found in soil, hay, sphagnum moss, and plants, it usually affects farmers, gardeners, and agricultural workers. It enters through small cuts in the skin to cause the infection. In case of sporotrichosis affecting the lungs, the fungal spores enter by breathing in. Sporotrichosis can also be acquired from handling cats with the disease; it is an occupational hazard for veterinarians.

Treatment depends on the site and extent of infection. Topical antifungals can be applied to skin lesions.  Deep infection in lungs may require surgery.  Medications used include Itraconazole, posaconazole and amphotericin B. Most people recover with treatment. The outcome may not be so good if there is a weak immune system or widespread disease.

The causal fungus is found worldwide. The species was named for Benjamin Schenck, a medical student who in 1896 was the first to isolate it from a human specimen.

It has been reported in cats, mules, dogs, mice and rats.

Signs and symptoms

 Cutaneous or skin sporotrichosis
This is the most common form of this disease.  Symptoms of this form include nodular lesions or bumps in the skin, at the point of entry and also along lymph nodes and vessels.  The lesion starts off small and painless, and ranges in color from pink to purple.  Left untreated, the lesion becomes larger and look similar to a boil and more lesions will appear, until a chronic ulcer develops.

Usually, cutaneous sporotrichosis lesions occur in the finger, hand, and arm.
 Pulmonary sporotrichosis
This rare form of the disease occur when S. schenckii spores are inhaled.  Symptoms of pulmonary sporotrichosis include productive coughing, nodules and cavitations of the lungs, fibrosis, and swollen hilar lymph nodes.  Patients with this form of sporotrichosis are susceptible to developing tuberculosis and pneumonia
 Disseminated sporotrichosis
When the infection spreads from the primary site to secondary sites in the body, the disease develops into a rare and critical form called disseminated sporotrichosis.  The infection can spread to joints and bones (called osteoarticular sporotrichosis) as well as the central nervous system and the brain (called sporotrichosis meningitis).

The symptoms of disseminated sporotrichosis include weight loss, anorexia, and bone lesions.

Complications

Sporotrichosis lesions on the skin can become infected with bacteria. Cellulitis may also occur.

Diagnosis

Sporotrichosis is a chronic disease with slow progression and often subtle symptoms.  It is difficult to diagnose, as many other diseases share similar symptoms and therefore must be ruled out.

Patients with sporotrichosis will have antibody against the fungus S. schenckii, however, due to variability in sensitivity and specificity, it may not be a reliable diagnosis for this disease.  The confirming diagnosis remains culturing the fungus from the skin, sputum, synovial fluid, and cerebrospinal fluid. Smears should be taken from the draining tracts and ulcers.

Cats with sporotrichosis are unique in that the exudate from their lesions may contain numerous organisms. This makes cytological evaluation of exudate a valuable diagnostic tool in this species. Exudate is pyogranulomatous and phagocytic cells may be packed with yeast forms. These are variable in size, but many are cigar-shaped.

Differential diagnosis
Differential diagnosis includes: leishmaniasis, nocardiosis, mycobacterium marinum, cat-scratch disease, leprosy, syphilis, sarcoidosis and tuberculosis.

Prevention
The majority of sporotrichosis cases occur when the fungus is introduced through a cut or puncture in the skin while handling vegetation containing the fungal spores.  Prevention of this disease includes wearing long sleeves and gloves while working with soil, hay bales, rose bushes, pine seedlings, and sphagnum moss.

The risk of sporotrichosis in cats is increased in male cats that roam outdoors. Accordingly, the risk may be reduced by keeping cats indoors or neutering them. Isolating infected animals can also be a preventive measure. The risk of spread from infected cats to humans can be reduced by appropriate biosafety measures, including wearing protective equipment when handling a cat with suspected sporotrichosis and by washing hands, arms and clothing after handling the cat.

Treatment
Treatment of sporotrichosis depends on the severity and location of the disease.  The following are treatment options for this condition:
 Oral potassium iodide
Potassium iodide is an anti-fungal drug that is widely used as a treatment for cutaneous sporotrichosis. Despite its wide use, there is no high-quality evidence for or against this practice. Further studies are needed to assess the efficacy and safety of oral potassium iodide in the treatment of sporotrichosis.
 Itraconazole (Sporanox) and fluconazole
These are antifungal drugs.  Itraconazole is currently the drug of choice and is significantly more effective than fluconazole. Fluconazole should be reserved for patients who cannot tolerate itraconazole.
 Amphotericin B
This antifungal medication is delivered intravenously.  Many patients, however, cannot tolerate Amphotericin B due to its potential side effects of fever, nausea, and vomiting.
Lipid formulations of amphotericin B are usually recommended instead of amphotericin B deoxycholate because of a better adverse-effect profile. Amphotericin B can be used for severe infection during pregnancy. For children with disseminated or severe disease, amphotericin B deoxycholate can be used initially, followed by itraconazole.

In case of sporotrichosis meningitis, the patient may be given a combination of Amphotericin B and 5-fluorocytosine/Flucytosine.
 Terbinafine
500mg and 1000mg daily dosages of terbinafine for twelve to 24 weeks has been used to treat cutaneous sporotrichosis.
 Newer triazoles
Several studies have shown that posaconazole has in vitro activity similar to that of amphotericin B and itraconazole; therefore, it shows promise as an alternative therapy. However, voriconazole susceptibility varies. Because the correlation between in vitro data and clinical response has not been demonstrated, there is insufficient evidence to recommend either posaconazole or voriconazole for treatment of sporotrichosis at this time.
 Surgery
In cases of bone infection and cavitary nodules in the lungs, surgery may be necessary.
 Heat therapy
Heat creates higher tissue temperatures, which may inhibit fungus growth while the immune system counteracts the infection. The "pocket warmer" used for this purpose has the advantage of being able to maintain a constant temperature of 44 degrees-45 degrees C on the skin surface for several hours, while permitting unrestricted freedom of movement.  The duration of treatment depends on the type of lesion, location, depth, and size. Generally, local application for 1-2 h per day, or in sleep time, for 5-6 weeks seems to be sufficient.

Other animals

Sporotrichosis can be diagnosed in domestic and wild mammals. In veterinary medicine it is most frequently seen in cats and horses.  Cats have a particularly severe form of cutaneous sporotrichosis. Infected cats may exhibit abscesses, cellulitis, or draining wounds that fail to respond to antibiotic treatment.

Sporotrichosis can spread from nonhuman animals to humans (zoonosis). Infected cats in particular exude large quantities of Sporothrix organisms from their skin leasions and can spread the infection to people who handle them. Although cats are the most common animal source, the infection has also been known to spread to humans from dogs, rats, squirrels, and armadillos.

See also 
 Mucormycosis
 List of cutaneous conditions

References

External links 

Animal fungal diseases
Bird diseases
Bovine diseases
Cat diseases
Horse diseases
Mycosis-related cutaneous conditions
Rodent diseases
Sheep and goat diseases
Swine diseases
Zoonoses
Fungal diseases